The 2001 UEFA Futsal Championship was the third official edition of the UEFA-governed European Championship for national futsal teams. It was held in Russia, between 22 February and 28 February 2001, in one venue located in the city of Moscow.

Qualification

Qualified teams

Venue

Squads

Final tournament

Group A

Group B

Knockout stage

Semi-finals

Third place play-off

Final

External links
 UEFA.com

 
2001
UEFA
UEFA
2001
Sports competitions in Moscow
UEFA Futsal Championship